Bihud or Beyhud may refer to:
 Beyhud, Razavi Khorasan
 Bihud, South Khorasan